Admiral Graf Spee may refer to:
 
Graf Maximilian von Spee (1861–1914), German admiral
Admiral Graf Spee, a 1934 Heavy cruiser (pocket battleship) named after Spee